June Ward Gayle (February 22, 1865 – August 5, 1942) was a U.S. Representative from Kentucky.

Born in New Liberty, Kentucky, Gayle attended Concord College, New Liberty, Kentucky, and Georgetown College, Georgetown, Kentucky.
Deputy sheriff.
He served as member of the Democratic State central committee and of the State executive committee.
High sheriff of Owen County 1892-1896.
He was an unsuccessful candidate for State auditor in 1899.
He engaged in banking and in the tobacco business.

Gayle was elected as a Democrat to the Fifty-sixth Congress to fill the vacancy caused by the death of Evan E. Settle and served from January 15, 1900, to March 3, 1901.
He resumed his former business activities.
He died in Owenton, Kentucky, on August 5, 1942.
He was interred in New Liberty Cemetery, New Liberty, Kentucky.

References

1865 births
1942 deaths
Kentucky sheriffs
Democratic Party members of the United States House of Representatives from Kentucky